Yang Huiyu (214 – July 278), formally known as Empress Jingxian, semi-formally known as Empress Dowager Hongxun (弘訓太后), was an empress dowager of the Jin dynasty of China. She was the third wife of Sima Shi, a regent of the Cao Wei state in the Three Kingdoms period. Her father, Yang Chai (羊茝), was the commandery administrator of Shangdang, while her mother was a daughter of the Han dynasty historian and musician Cai Yong. Her younger full brother was Yang Hu, a military general who served under the Jin dynasty.

Life 
In 234, Sima Shi's first wife Xiahou Hui died. Later, Sima Shi married another noblewoman (a daughter of Wu Zhi), but he soon divorced her. He eventually married Yang Huiyu, because she was a politicized, talented, intelligent and generous woman.

Yang Huiyu did not have any sons with Sima Shi – who did not have any sons with his prior wives or concubines either. As a result, his brother Sima Zhao became the regent after his death. After Sima Zhao's death, his son Sima Yan usurped the throne from the last Cao Wei emperor Cao Huan and established the Jin dynasty. In recognition of his uncle's contribution, he honoured Yang Huiyu as an empress dowager in 266 and housed her in Hongxun Palace (which is why she was semi-formally known as Empress Dowager Hongxun). It was said that it was at her insistence that Emperor Wu also posthumously honoured Sima Shi's first wife, Xiahou Hui, as Empress Jinghuai. She died in 278 at the age of 65 (by East Asian age reckoning) and was buried with honours due an empress beside Sima Shi.

Family

See also
 Lists of people of the Three Kingdoms

References

 Fang, Xuanling (ed.) (648). Book of Jin (Jin Shu).

214 births
278 deaths
People of Cao Wei
Jin dynasty (266–420) empresses dowager
3rd-century Chinese women